This is a list of earthquakes in 1963. Only magnitude 6.0 or greater earthquakes appear on the list. Lower magnitude events are included if they have caused death, injury or damage. Events which occurred in remote areas will be excluded from the list as they wouldn't have generated significant media interest. All dates are listed according to UTC time. Maximum intensities are indicated on the Mercalli intensity scale and are sourced from United States Geological Survey (USGS) ShakeMap data. A fairly active year with 17 events reaching above magnitude 7.0. The intensity of the events was stronger with 2 measuring above magnitude 8. Both events came within 3 weeks of each other. The strongest of 1963 was in the Kuril Islands, Russia and was magnitude 8.5. Macedonia had by far the most of the 1,488 fatalities. A fairly modest magnitude 6.0 event in July resulted in 1,070 deaths and substantial destruction. Libya had one of the worst events in its history in February. Again a fairly moderate magnitude 5.6 ended up with 300 deaths in the area.

Overall

By death toll 

 Note: At least 10 casualties

By magnitude 

 Note: At least 7.0 magnitude

Notable events

January

February

March

April

May

June

July

August

September

October

November

December

References

1963
 
1963